is a Japanese jazz drummer who participated in some of Japan's more well known fusion bands. He was a former member of jazz-fusion band Casiopea.

Biography
In 1979, he joined a fusion group called Guitarist Creek. They participated in Cross-Wind (a large fusion concert also known as East-West). Masaaki met Casiopea at this time and they became good friends. He also met Hidehiko Matsumoto and his group. He played with the jazz vocalist Henri Kanno, Mikio Masuda, jazz pianist, and other jazz groups.

In 1990, Tetsuo Sakurai and Akira Jimbo left Casiopea to form Jimsaku. Yoshihiro Naruse and Hiyama joined Casiopea.

In August 1992, Masaaki resigned from Casiopea under doctor's advice due to health issues because of his smoking habit. Masaaki recorded four albums with Casiopea.

After Casiopea
After regaining his health, he returned to jazz. He joined a music school that was dedicated to teaching.

Today, Masaaki participates in both rock and jazz fields in his drum project along with band members. His nickname, given to him by Yoshihiro Naruse, is "The Godfather".

References

External links
 Takagi's home music studio and music lessons that he is the part of teaching drum
 His Picture on nowadays

1959 births
Japanese male musicians
Japanese musicians
Living people
Japanese jazz drummers
Casiopea members